Kaadu is a 2014 Indian Tamil language film written and directed by Stalin Ramalingam and produced by Nehru Nagar Nandhu. The film stars Vidharth and Samskruthy Shenoy, while Vettai Muthukumar, Samuthirakani, Thambi Ramaiah, and Aadukalam Naren, among others, play supporting roles. Editing was done by Kasi Vishwanathan, and the music was composed by K. The film was released on 21 November 2014.

Plot
Velu has his livelihood based on the forest nearby, selling firewood collected from the forest to the people in the locality. He believes in nature and conserving it to give the next generation all the resources that they have obtained. Poongodi, a school student, lives in a nearby town. She falls in love with Velu and vice versa. Karuna, Velu's friend, aspires to be a forest officer, but being poor, he is unable to cope up the bribe that is needed by the selectors. In desperation, he tries to smuggle sandalwood for an agent but gets caught. He requests Velu to take his place so as to not ruin his chance of getting his dream job. The amiable Velu agrees, not realizing that his friend might not be the man that he is posing to be. Velu comes across Nandha, a political leader and social reformist in the jail where he is imprisoned. Under Nandha's guidance, Velu transforms into a different man. Here, things take a turn in his life. Meanwhile, Karuna tricks the DFO, becomes a forest officer, and tries to take over the forest for his personal gains by driving away the people of the forest. In the crossfire between the government and the smugglers, the gullible villagers are exploited by both the parties. Velu gets bail and fights against Karuna and the smugglers to save the villagers from migrating to the city for survival and forest from the smugglers. The movie ends with a message that if we are not going to take care of our forests and continue to ravage it, then nature would hit us with such power that humankind would not be able to withstand its onslaught.

Cast

Vidharth as Velu
Samskruthy Shenoy as Poonkodi
Vettai Muthukumar as Karuna
Samuthirakani as Nanda
Aadukalam Naren as Forest Officer
Thambi Ramaiah as Chettiar
George Maryan as Koottayan
Singampuli as Madurai
T. K. Kala as Velu's mother
V. K. Thanabalan as Judge
R. N. R. Manohar
Vichu Vishwanath
Poo Ram as Forest Ranger Gopal
Lakshmi Vasudevan as Poonkodi's mother
Adhiravan as Poonkodi's uncle
Ravi Venkataraman as Ravichandran IAS
Supergood Kannan

Production
Vidharth began work on his portions in January 2014, taking part in a schedule held in Dharmapuri which lasted for a month. The team subsequently completed schedules throughout 2014 and promotional activity began in October 2014.

Release
The film had a limited release across Tamil Nadu on 21 November 2014, owing to the presence of several other releases at the box office. It opened to mixed reviews, though The New Indian Express gave the film a positive review, stating "fairly neatly scripted and narrated, Kaadu is a very promising effort from a debutant maker."

Soundtrack
The soundtrack was composed by K.

References

External links
 

2014 films
Films shot in Tamil Nadu
2010s Tamil-language films
Films scored by K (composer)